Chao Yao-tung (1916 – 20 August 2008) was a Taiwanese politician, and economist.

In 1971, Chao helped founded China Steel. He was the Minister of Economic Affairs from 1981 to 1984. Chao then served as chairman of the Council for Economic Planning and Development until 1988. Alongside Li Kwoh-ting, Chao became known for his influence on the Taiwan Miracle.

Chao Yao-tung died of multiple organ dysfunction syndrome on 20 August 2008, at the age of 92.

References 

2008 deaths
20th-century Taiwanese economists
Deaths from multiple organ failure
Place of birth missing
Place of death missing
1916 births
Politicians from Huai'an
Republic of China politicians from Jiangsu
Taiwanese Ministers of Economic Affairs
Taiwanese people from Jiangsu
Businesspeople in steel
20th-century Taiwanese businesspeople
Taiwanese chairpersons of corporations
National Wuhan University alumni